Macrocilix ophrysa is a moth in the family Drepanidae. It was described by Hong-Fu Chu and Lin-Yao Wang in 1988. It is found in Yunnan, China.

The length of the forewings is about 20 mm. There is a narrow patch on the forewings, with a J-shaped mark inside it. There is a brow-like marking above this patch.

References

Moths described in 1988
Drepaninae
Moths of Asia